Douglas Lee may refer to:

 Douglas Lee (restaurateur) (1962-2013), former co-owner of The Big Texan Steak Ranch
 Douglas Lee (choreographer) born 1977

See also
Doug Lee (disambiguation)